Dr. Freud Will See You Now, Mrs. Hitler is an alternate history play written by British comedy writing duo Laurence Marks and Maurice Gran.

The play is an "alternate history" dramatisation based on reports that Adolf Hitler, then aged 6, was referred to Sigmund Freud for therapy at the latter's pædiatric psychotherapy clinic in Vienna, but did not go to meet him; the point of divergence is that this meeting went ahead.

The play was broadcast on 31 March 2007 in cut-down form by the BBC on Radio 4 as part of The Saturday Play. A semi-dramatised reading in aid of the Freud Museum Foundation was performed on 13 May 2007 at the Tricycle Theatre, and was followed by a panel discussion with the writers together with the Chair of the Freud Museum's Board, Lisa Appignanesi, and an expert on Freud, Prof. John Forrester (historian).

References

External links
 

Alternate history plays
BBC Radio 4 programmes
2007 audio plays
Cultural depictions of Adolf Hitler
Cultural depictions of Sigmund Freud
Plays based on real people